Early on the Sunday morning of April 25, 1965, 16-year-old Michael Andrew Clark opened fire on cars traveling along U.S. Highway 101 just south of Orcutt, California from a nearby hilltop. Three people were killed and ten were wounded before Clark committed suicide upon arrival of police.

Shooting
Late on the night of April 24, 1965, Michael Andrew Clark, who lived in Long Beach, California, left home in his parents' car, without their permission. In the back of the car, he had a Swedish Mauser military rifle equipped with telescopic sight and a pistol he had removed from his father's locked gun safe along with a large quantity of ammunition. Early the next Sunday morning, he climbed to the top of a hill overlooking a stretch of Highway 101 near Orcutt. As the sun came up, Clark began shooting at automobiles driving down the 101 highway.

Two were killed and six more were wounded as the shooting continued for hours before Santa Barbara County Sheriff's Office deputies rushed the hill and Clark committed suicide as they closed in. A five-year-old-boy wounded in the head died a day later bringing the total to three dead for the rampage.

Reportedly the two men killed at the scene of the shooting were attempting to assist others who were trapped in a vehicle which had been hit by the gunfire.

Victims 
Those killed were:

 Charles Christopher Hogan, 21
 Joel W. Kocab, 28
 Kevin Dean Reida, 5

Those wounded were:

 Doris Burson, 24, injured by glass fragments
 Alice Jones, 31, injured by glass fragments
 Marvine Jones, 12, injured by glass fragments
 Bill Reida, 42, shot in the neck
 Lucille Reida, 44, wife of Bill Reida, injured by glass fragments
 Kim Allen Reida, 3, son of Bill and Lucille Reida, graze wound
 Norbert Schuerman, 38, policeman, shot in the left arm
 Kathleen Smith, 22, injured by glass fragments
 Renee Terry, 15, shot in the right forearm
 Joyce Zinek, 39, injured by glass fragments

Aftermath
A lawsuit was eventually brought to the courts by victims William, Lucille, and Kim Reida, complaining that parents Forest and Joyce Clark were negligent in two counts: "failure of the Clarks to train, control, and supervise son Michael" and also, "failure of Forest Clark to keep the rifle out of Michael’s hands."  The case was decided in favor of the Clarks and generally upheld on appeal, although the appeals court found negligence on the part of father Forest Clark for not adequately securing the weapons.

See also
 List of rampage killers in the United States
 List of homicides in California
Targets

Cited works and further reading

References

1965 murders in the United States
1965 in California
Murder in California
Murder committed by minors
U.S. Route 101
History of Santa Barbara County, California
Deaths by firearm in California
1965 mass shootings in the United States
Murder–suicides in California
Crimes in California
April 1965 events in the United States
Mass shootings in California
American criminal snipers
Mass shootings in the United States